Naane Varuvean is a 2022 Indian Tamil-language horror thriller film directed by Selvaraghavan. The film stars his brother Dhanush who appears in a dual role for the third time after Kodi and Pattas. Naane Varuvean marks Dhanush’s reunion with Selvaraghavan after Mayakkam Enna. The film's music is composed by Yuvan Shankar Raja, while the cinematography is handled by Om Prakash and editing is done by Bhuvan Srinivasan.

The film was released theatrically on 29 September 2022, and received positive reviews from critics and audience and became a box office success.

Plot
 
Prabhu and Kathir are identical twins, while Prabhu is an innocent guy, Kathir has always been a troublemaker, earning the wrath of their father, who is tired of constantly disciplining him. When Kathir beats up the neighbor kid, their father ties Kathir up in the backyard to a tree. Kathir goes missing overnight, apparently kidnapped by an unnamed psychotic person, where the person is revealed to be a serial killer preying on his targets in the jungle. Kathir kills him and returns home, where he continues his erratic behavior. Kathir locks Prabhu inside a wooden box and stabs his father multiple times, killing him. Kathir's mother does not turn him in to the cops, but instead, seeks the help of a local saint. The saint tells her that the twins cannot co-exist and have to be separated to save one of them. Frustrated, their mother abandons Kathir in a temple and flees with Prabhu, despite his request to not leave him there.

Years later, Prabhu is a well settled family man with a loving wife, Bhuvana, and a daughter, Sathya, with whom he is extremely attached to.  At the age of 12, Sathya starts developing symptoms of schizophrenia, which starts disrupting the peace of Prabhu's family. She starts talking to some unknown person, and often loses sleep. After repeatedly hearing his daughter talk to herself in the middle of the night, Prabhu plants a baby monitor in her room and records her communication with the unknown. She breaks the monitor and throws it out of the room, revealing that the unknown person asked her to break the monitor or he will kill Prabhu. Worried by the recent happenings, Prabhu takes his daughter to a psychiatrist, who tries to extract information from Sathya about the unknown person in her room. Sathya reveals that the  unknown person is Sonu, a small kid who talks to her often.

Despite Prabhu and the psychiatrist rejecting Sathya's claim that Sonu exists, Sathya is still adamant that he is real. Based on his own research, Prabhu hires a group of young ghostbusters, whom he came across on YouTube. The technical team plants high end technical equipment to monitor the paranormal activity inside Sathya's room. At the middle of the night, the team finds footprints, using UV lighting, only to find Sathya missing from her room. The footprints lead back to Sathya's room, hinting she made a quick trip back to her room. The door is locked, where they start hearing Sathya's voice again. Terrified and fearing for Sathya's life, Prabhu tries to open the door, but the door unlocks itself and Sathya begins to talk in Marathi. The crew helps Prabhu understand and translate Sathya's communication. Possessed by Sonu's voice, Sathya reveals that Prabhu has to deal with Kathir and put an end to his atrocities that caused Sonu's death.

Realizing the impact of the possession, the psychiatrist suggests to Prabhu to fulfill the requests of Sonu's spirit. It is revealed that Kathir, who was abandoned by his mother and Prabhu, struggled to find livelihood, where he was abused by the people, who tried to take advantage of him. Unable to control his thirst for killing, Kathir ended up killing all of them. Eventually, Kathir found the love of his life, Madhuri, a mute woman. They get married and settled in a remote cabin in the forest with twins Sonu and Manu. One day, Sonu hid himself in his father's jeep and followed him to document and vlog the hunting of wild animals by Kathir, but witness his father killing a bunch of tourists, who disrespected him in front of his kids, over a petty issue of marijuana.

Earlier, Kathir refused to provide marijuana to the tourists. Kathir explains to Sonu that he will not be able to understand his urge and requested him to hide this fact from the rest of the family. Eventually, Sonu told Madhuri and Manu about Kathir's true nature, where the family's peace was disturbed. When Madhuri wanted to abandon Kathir with the twins. She even assured Kathir that she will not go to the cops. In the fear of losing his family again, Kathir locked up the twins and Madhuri. Madhuri then mixed tablets on Kathir's drinks which made him to fall asleep and Madhuri tried to escape again with the twins. Their plan backfires when Kathir saw them. Despite her pleadings that she will not report to the cops about Kathir, he refused to leave her with the twins. In the ensuing argument, Kathir ended up accidentally killing Madhuri with his knife. His elder son and twin, Sonu was also accidentally killed in the altercation. Manu was terrified and taken back by Kathir.

The psychiatrist, Guna, Prabhu, and Sathya travel to Chopda, a North Indian hill town backed by huge acres of lush green forests. Sathya only responds when called as Sonu. Sathya's mental health eventually starts deteriorating. Prabhu takes Sathya to Sonu's school. Upon finding Manu, she tries to talk with him, but starts running away in fear. She speaks in Marathi and signals in sign language, gaining Manu's trust. Sathya promises to save Manu from Kathir, with his uncle Prabhu's help. Manu asks Sathya and the others to meet him later that night at his home and cautions them to be careful as Kathir has the knowledge about the forest and has exemplary hunting skills.

Prabhu and Kathir eventually meet up after a long time, where Prabhu confesses that he knows about Kathir's urge to kill and pleads him to leave Manu and tells him that he will not report any of these happenings, to the authorities. Kathir vehemently refuses and a desperate Prabhu fights Kathir. Prabhu, lacking combat skills is heavily injured by Kathir and is almost killed by him. Possessed by Sonu, Sathya exhibits her archery skills and hurts Kathir to stop him from killing Prabhu. Manu threatens Kathir that he will jump down the cliff, if Kathir does not stop. Prabhu tackles Kathir off the cliff with him, to their death. Sonu leaves Sathya as a result. Prabhu comes back climbing the cliff top. Prabhu claims that everything has been sorted out and that Kathir is dead. However, Manu, being confident of Kathir's survival skills, asks Prabhu to feel Kathir's existence, using twin telepathy, to confirm whether he is dead or not, by closing his eyes.

When Prabhu suddenly opens his eyes, the screen cuts to black. It is not revealed whether Kathir is dead or alive, also it is not shown whether Prabhu gets possessed or not.

Cast

Production

Development 
Kalaipuli S. Thanu announced a project with Dhanush with the tentative title D44. On 14 January 2021, the film's title was announced to be Naane Varuven. Thanu was revealed to be producing the film under the banner V Creations, while Selvaraghavan was announced to be directing the film marking his 5th collaboration with Dhanush after Thulluvadho Ilamai, Kaadhal Kondein, Pudhupettai and Mayakkam Enna and Yuvan Shankar Raja was announced as the music composer. It was reported that Dhanush himself wrote the story of the film.

Om Prakash and Prasanna GK were announced to be cinematographer and editor of the film respectively marking former's sixth collaboration with Dhanush after Anegan, Maari, Maari 2, Pattas, and Thiruchitrambalam, while marking the latter's sixth collaboration with Dhanush after Maari, Pa Paandi, Velaiilla Pattadhari 2, Maari 2, and Maaran.

Casting 
Dhanush plays dual roles in this film. For his role, the actor had undergone archery training. It was reported that there will be two female leads in the film. Indhuja Ravichandran was cast in as one of the female lead opposite Dhanush. Selvaraghavan, in addition to directing, is also likely to play a crucial role in this film. Comedian Yogi Babu is also playing a key role in this film, collaborating with Dhanush for the second time after Karnan. Veteran actor Prabhu is also added to the cast of the film and he will also be playing an important role in the film.

Filming 
Principal photography of the film began on 16 October 2021. On 16 February 2022, the next schedule of the shoot started in Ooty. On 11 April 2022 it was revealed that Dhanush had wrapped up shooting for the film. Post production works began in April 2022. Dhanush and Selvaraghavan completed dubbing for their portions.

Music 

The film's soundtrack and background score is composed by Yuvan Shankar Raja collaborating with Dhanush for the seventh time, followed by Maari 2, Yaaradi Nee Mohini, Pudhupettai, Kaadhal Kondein, Pudhukottaiyilirundhu Saravanan and Thulluvadho Ilamai. The film album consist of 4 songs. Selvaraghavan and Dhanush each wrote the lyrics for two of the songs while Yugabharathi wrote the lyrics for rest of the songs.

Release

Theatrical 
Naane Varuvean was released worldwide in theaters on 29 September 2022 a day prior to the release of Ponniyin Selvan: I. The film was released in the UK and Europe by Ahimsa Entertainment.

Home media 
The satellite rights of the film were sold to Sun TV, while the digital streaming rights were acquired by Amazon Prime Video. The film began digitally streaming on Amazon Prime Video from 27 October 2022. The film was premiered on Sun TV on 25 December 2022 on the occasion of Christmas.

Reception

Critical response  
Naane Varuvean received positive reviews from critics and audience.

Firstpost rated the film 3 out of 5 stars and wrote "Selvaraghavan and Dhanush and back together after a decade and this time, they choose yet another dark theme. With a short runtime and clean screenplay, Naane Varuven's exploration of psychopath is intriguing". Janani K of India Today rated the film 2.5 out of 5 stars and wrote  "Naane Varuven sees Dhanush exploring the psychological horror genre. Sadly, it is a missed opportunity because of its sluggish second half". Kirubhakar Purushothaman of The Indian Express rated the film 1.5 out of 5 stars and wrote "Dhanush and his director brother Selvaraghavan, known for hits Kadhal Kondein and Mayakkam Enna, have joined hands after about a decade to make a film that is weakest of all their collaborations". Soundarya Athimuthu of The Quint rated the film 2.5 out of 5 and wrote "Naane Varuvean still falls slightly short of excellence with a predictable and flat drama, especially in the second half."  M Suganth of The Times of India rated the film 2.5 out of 5 and wrote "We get an underwhelming climax that is left open-ended just so there is room for a sequel." Haricharan Pudipeddi of Hindustan Times wrote "Yuvan Shankar Raja's score plays a key role in amplifying the mood of the film." Arvind V of Pinkvilla rated the film 3 out of 5 and wrote "Yuvan Shankar Raja's background score is moody in a good sense." Sudhir Srinivasan of Cinema Express rated the film 2.5 out of 5 stars and wrote "This film speaks of good and bad, light and darkness, god and devil." Vijaya Shankar of DT Next rated the film 2 out of 5 and wrote "On the whole, Naane Varuvean has interesting ideas and the set-up for an intriguing horror was so well done in the first half, but soon falls short of what it promised and loses its charm due to its underwhelming second half." Dinamalar rated the film 3 out of 5 stars. Bharath Vijayakumar of Moviecrow rated the film 3 out of 5 and wrote that "This is a welcome genre film featuring a star hero and the  first half is a pleasant surprise."

Box office 
On the first day of its release, the film collected over  crores in India. Despite clashing with Ponniyin Selvan: I after one day of its release, the film managed to collect over  crores.

References

External links 
 

2020s Tamil-language films
2022 horror thriller films
Films scored by Yuvan Shankar Raja
Films directed by Selvaraghavan
Indian horror thriller films